The 2010 LPGA Tour was a series of weekly golf tournaments for elite female golfers from around the world that began in Thailand on February 13, 2010 and ended in Florida on December 5, 2010. The tournaments were sanctioned by the United States-based Ladies Professional Golf Association (LPGA).

The tour included 24 tournaments, including events in Malaysia, southern California, and two in New Jersey that were new to the schedule in 2010. Of the 24 tournaments on the schedule, 14 were hosted in the United States. The 2010 season was the tour's smallest schedule in nearly 40 years.

Na Yeon Choi, a third-year player from Korea, topped the official money list with earnings of $1,871,166. She had two wins and 15 top-10 finishes in 23 starts and won the Vare Trophy, given to the player with the lowest scoring average.  Yani Tseng from Taiwan captured Player of the Year honors; she won three tournaments in 2010 including two of the four major championships. Spaniard Azahara Muñoz won the Rookie of the Year Award.

The four majors were won by: Yani Tseng (Kraft Nabisco Championship), Cristie Kerr (LPGA Championship), Paula Creamer (U.S. Women's Open), and Yani Tseng (Women's British Open). Tseng's win in the Women's British Open at age 21 made her the youngest player in LPGA history to win three major championships.

Changes in the 2010 season
The 2010 season was the 60th anniversary of the LPGA Tour. As with most years, changes were made to the schedule from the previous year, which included:

The LPGA Championship sponsorship changed from McDonald's to Wegmans, and the major was moved from Havre de Grace, Maryland, to Rochester, New York. The championship's new home is the Locust Hill Country Club, the host course for the Wegmans LPGA, a regular tour event which was discontinued.
The first tournament of the season in the U.S. was the Kia Classic, held in late March at La Costa in Carlsbad, California.
Missing from the schedule was the longtime stop in Phoenix.
The Sybase Match Play Championship made its debut, replacing the Sybase Classic; both held in northern New Jersey.
The Bell Micro LPGA Classic returned after a one-year hiatus, held the week of May 10–16.
After a three-year absence from Atlantic City, the tour returned with long-time supporter ShopRite as the title sponsor.

Schedule and results
The season included 24 official money events, compared with 34 just two years earlier, as the LPGA struggled to cope with the economic downturn. There were three unofficial money events, with 17 off-weeks between the first and last events in 2010.

Tournaments in bold are majors.
1 Hee Kyung Seo was not a member of the LPGA at the time of her win in the Kia Classic.
2 Exhibition tournament, unofficial earnings.

Leaders
Money List leaders

Full 2010 Official Money List- navigate to "2010"

Scoring Average leaders

Full 2010 Scoring Average List - navigate to "2010", then "Scoring Average"

Awards and honors
The three competitive awards given out by the LPGA each year are:
The Rolex Player of the Year is awarded based on a formula in which points are awarded for top-10 finishes and are doubled at the LPGA's four major championships. 
2010 Winner:  Yani Tseng . Runner-up:  Cristie Kerr
The Vare Trophy, named for Glenna Collett-Vare, is given to the player with the lowest scoring average for the season.
2010 Winner:  Na Yeon Choi. Runner-up:  Cristie Kerr 
The Louise Suggs Rolex Rookie of the Year Award is awarded to the first-year player on the LPGA Tour who scores the highest in a points competition in which points are awarded at all full-field domestic events and doubled at the LPGA's four major championships. The award is named after Louise Suggs, one of the founders of the LPGA.
2010 Winner:  Azahara Muñoz. Runner-up:  Beatriz Recari

See also
2010 in golf
2010 Ladies European Tour
2010 Duramed Futures Tour

References

External links
Official site

LPGA Tour seasons
LPGA Tour